Bazigit Atavovich  Atajev (born 3 December 1979) is a Russian mixed martial artist and sanshou kickboxer, who currently competes in the Light Heavyweight division. A professional since 2000, he has competed in RINGS and PRIDE Fighting Championships. He is known for a fierce spinning heel kick and Sambo style grappling.

Early life 
Bozigit was born in 1979 in the village of Lower Kazanyshy to a Kumyk family. He studied in the famous in Dagestan sports-dedicated boarding school "Five Directions of the World".

Mixed martial arts career
Bozigit started his MMA career in 2000 knocking out Arunas Juskevicius at RINGS Lithuania: Bushido RINGS 1 . Next year he won 16 participant tournament "IAFC Pankration Russian Championship 2001". He knocked out Roman Zentsov by spinning wheel kick and Aaron Brink by spinning back kick, and defeated Tsuyoshi Kohsaka by decision in the same year.

PRIDE Fighting Championships
Atajev debuted in PRIDE in December 2002 and suffered his only loss against Dutchman Alistair Overeem at PRIDE 24. Atajev planned to make his return to PRIDE at their final event PRIDE 34 against Gilbert Yvel. However, due to a stomach illness, the bout was cancelled.

Professional Fighters League
Atajev made his debut in North America on 21 June 2018 at PFL 2 against Dan Spohn in Light heavyweight tournaments. He lost the fight by technical knockout in the third round.

In his second fight in the tournament, Atajev faced Sean O'Connell at PFL 7 on 30 August 2018. He won the fight via TKO in the first round.

In the semifinals, Atajev faced Vinny Magalhaes, losing via first-round submission.

In 2019, Atajev fought Dan Spohn in a rematch at PFL 3, winning in via first-round knockout. On 8 August at PFL 6, Atajev fought Emiliano Sordi, losing via first-round knockout. He faced Sordi again in the quarterfinals of the 2019 tournament, losing via rear-naked choke submission in the first round.

Wushu sanda
Bozigit Ataev is one of three five time Wushu Sanda world champions along with Muslim Salikhov and Mohsen Mohammadseifi. He won world championship in 1999 , 2001, 2003, 2005, 2013 and earned silver medal in 2009

Kickboxing
Bozigit took part in "BARS: Heavyweight Cup Of Gold BARS 2003" kickboxing tournament. He defeated Denis Grigoriev in first round but loss to Eduard Voznovich in final. In 2008, he faced the eventual K-1 champion Remy Bonjasky in his kickboxing debut. He was defeated by knockout early in the third round.

Mixed martial arts record

|-
|Loss
|align=center|20–5–1
|Emiliano Sordi	
|Submission (rear-naked choke)
| rowspan=2| PFL 9
| rowspan=2| 
|align=center| 1
|align=center| 4:26
| rowspan=2| Las Vegas, Nevada, United States
|
|-
|Draw
|align=center|20–4–1
|Viktor Nemkov
| Draw (majority)
|align=center| 1
|align=center| 4:26
|
|-
|Loss
|align=center|20–4
|Emiliano Sordi
|KO (punches)
|PFL 6
|
|align=center| 1
|align=center| 1:22
|Atlantic City, New Jersey, United States
|
|-
|Win
|align=center|20–3
|Dan Spohn
|KO (punches)
|PFL 3
|
|align=center| 1
|align=center| 3:25
|Uniondale, New York, United States
|
|-
| Loss
|align=center|19–3
|Vinny Magalhães
|Submission (kimura)
| rowspan=2 |PFL 9
| rowspan=2 |
| align=center| 1
| align=center| 1:58
| rowspan=2 |Long Beach, California, United States
|
|-
|Win
|align=center|19–2
|Emiliano Sordi
|TKO (punches)
| align=center| 1
| align=center| 1:43
|
|-
| Win
| align=center| 18–2
| Sean O'Connell
| TKO (spinning back kick and punches)
| PFL 7
| 
| align=center| 1
| align=center| 3:30
| Atlantic City, New Jersey, United States
|
|-
| Loss
| align=center| 17–2
| Dan Spohn
| TKO (punches)
| PFL 2
| 
| align=center| 3
| align=center| 4:31
| Chicago, Illinois, United States
|Light Heavyweight debut.
|-
| Win
| align=center| 17–1
| Jeremy May
| TKO (punches)
| Kunlun Fight MMA 10
| 
| align=center| 1
| align=center| 2:15
| Beijing, China
| 
|-
| Win
| align=center| 16–1
| Valdas Pocevicius
| KO (punches)
| HERO'S Lithuania 2006
| 
| align=center| 1
| align=center| 2:02
| Vilnius, Lithuania
| 
|-
|  Win
| align=center| 15–1
| Beneilton Pereira da Silva
| TKO (punches)
| RINGS Russia: CIS vs. The World
| 
| align=center| 1
| align=center| 1:03
| Yekaterinburg, Russia
| 
|-
|  Win
| align=center| 14–1
| Mindaugas Kulikauskas
| Submission (armbar)
| Shooto Lithuania: King of Bushido Stage 1
| 
| align=center| 1
| align=center| 1:53
| Vilnius, Lithuania
| 
|-
|  Loss
| align=center| 13–1
| Alistair Overeem
| TKO (knee to the body)
| PRIDE 24
| 
| align=center| 2
| align=center| 4:59
| Fukuoka, Japan
| 
|-
|  Win
| align=center| 13–0
| Kestutis Arbocius
| Submission (guillotine choke)
| RINGS Lithuania: Bushido RINGS 5: Shock
| 
| align=center| 2
| align=center| 2:58
| Vilnius, Lithuania
| 
|-
|  Win
| align=center| 12–0
| Chris Franco
| Submission (neck crank)
| Shoot Boxing: S-Cup 2002
| 
| align=center| 1
| align=center| 2:31
| Yokohama, Japan
| 
|-
|  Win
| align=center| 11–0
| Tsuyoshi Kohsaka
| Decision (majority)
| RINGS: World Title Series 5
| 
| align=center| 3
| align=center| 5:00
| Yokohama, Japan
| 
|-
|  Win
| align=center| 10–0
| Aaron Brink
| KO (spinning back kick)
| RINGS: 10th Anniversary
| 
| align=center| 1
| align=center| 1:09
| Tokyo, Japana
| 
|-
|  Win
| align=center| 9–0
| Maynard Marcum
| KO (punch)
| RINGS: World Title Series 2
| 
| align=center| 1
| align=center| 1:08
| Yokohama, Japan
| 
|-
|  Win
| align=center| 8–0
| Roman Zentsov
| KO (spinning wheel kick)
| BARS: Moscow vs St. Petersburg
| 
| align=center| 1
| align=center| 0:10
| Moscow, Russia
| 
|-
|  Win
| align=center| 7–0
| Rolandas Digrys
| Submission (armbar)
| RINGS Lithuania: Bushido Rings 2
| 
| align=center| 1
| align=center| 0:47
| Vilnius, Lithuania
| 
|-
|  Win
| align=center| 6–0
| Dimitar Doichinov
| TKO (strikes)
| RINGS Russia: Russia vs. Bulgaria
| 
| align=center| 1
| align=center| 4:12
| Yekaterinburg, Russia
| 
|-
|  Win
| align=center| 5–0
| Islam Dadalov
| TKO (submission to strikes)
| IAFC: Pankration Russian Championship 2001
| 
| align=center| 1
| align=center| 0:48
| Yaroslavl, Russia
| 
|-
|  Win
| align=center| 4–0
| Vitali Shkraba
| TKO (corner stoppage)
| IAFC: Pankration Russian Championship 2001
| 
| align=center| 1
| align=center| 2:45
| Yaroslavl, Russia
| 
|-
|  Win
| align=center| 3–0
| Yuri Zhernikov
| TKO (submission to punches)
| IAFC: Pankration Russian Championship 2001
| 
| align=center| 1
| align=center| 2:26
| Yaroslavl, Russia
| 
|-
|  Win
| align=center| 2–0
| Tikhon Gladkov
| TKO (punches)
| IAFC: Pankration Russian Championship 2001
| 
| align=center| 1
| align=center| 1:41
| Yaroslavl, Russia
| 
|-
|  Win
| align=center| 1–0
| Arunas Juskevicius
| KO
| RINGS Lithuania: Bushido RINGS 1
| 
| align=center| 1
| align=center| 0:14
| Vilnius, Lithuania
|

Kickboxing record (incomplete)

|-  bgcolor="#FFBBBB"
| 2008-7-13 || Loss ||align=left|Remy Bonjasky || K-1 World GP 2008 in Taipei || Taipei City, Taiwan|| KO (jumping knee strike)  || 3 || 2:17 ||1-2
|-  bgcolor="#FFBBBB"
|  2003-06-25 || Loss ||align=left| Eduard Voznovich  ||  BARS: Heavyweight Cup Of Gold BARS 2003 || Moscow, Russia || Decision || 5 || 3:00 ||1-1
|-  bgcolor="#CCFFCC"
| 2003-06-25 || Win||align=left| Denis Grigoriev || BARS: Heavyweight Cup Of Gold BARS 2003 || Moscow, Russia|| Decision || 5 || 3:00 || 1-0

References

External links

Living people
Kumyks
Dagestani mixed martial artists
Russian sambo practitioners
Russian sanshou practitioners
Russian male kickboxers
Heavyweight mixed martial artists
Heavyweight kickboxers
Mixed martial artists utilizing sanshou
Mixed martial artists utilizing sambo
1979 births
Sportspeople from Dagestan